is a railway station on the Tobu Tojo Line in Itabashi, Tokyo, Japan, operated by the private railway operator Tobu Railway. Despite its name, the station is not actually located in Nerima, Tokyo.

Lines
Only "Local" (all-stations) services stop at this station, with eight trains per hour in each direction during the daytime.

Station layout
The station consists of two ground-level side platforms serving two tracks. The station has two entrances, "north" and "south", connected directly to platforms 2 and 1 respectively. The platforms are also linked by an underpass.

Platforms

Facilities and accessibility

Toilet facilities are provided on platform 1. Both platforms are wheelchair-accessible from the respective entrances.

History
The station opened on 29 December 1931. At the time of its opening, the station was located in the Tokumaru neighbourhood of the village of Akatsuka, however the station took its name from the town of Nerima immediately to the north of the station, as that was deemed to be better known. The station name was prefixed with the company name "Tobu" to differentiate it from the existing Nerima Station operated by the Musashino Railway (present-day Seibu Railway). The area around the station was absorbed into the City of Tokyo in 1932, all becoming part of Itabashi Ward, and it was not until 1947 that the former town of Nerima was split off from Itabashi Ward to become Nerima Ward.

From 17 March 2012, station numbering was introduced on the Tobu Tojo Line, with Tōbu-Nerima Station becoming "TJ-08".

Passenger statistics
In fiscal 2014, the station was used by an average of 59,102 passengers daily. The passenger figures for previous years are as shown below.

Surrounding area

South entrance
 JGSDF Camp Nerima

North entrance
 
 Daito Bunka University
 Daito Bunka University Dai-ichi High School

See also
 List of railway stations in Japan

References

External links

 Tobu station information 

Tobu Tojo Main Line
Stations of Tobu Railway
Railway stations in Tokyo
Railway stations in Japan opened in 1931